Daniel Henry MacParland was an Irish politician. He was a Fianna Fáil member of the Free State Seanad Éireann from 1931 to 1936. He was elected to the Seanad in 1931 for 9 years and served until the Free State Seanad was abolished in 1936.

References

Year of birth missing
Year of death missing
Fianna Fáil senators
Members of the 1931 Seanad
Members of the 1934 Seanad